"Lady Soul" is an R&B song recorded by legendary Motown group The Temptations for their 1986 album To Be Continued. The mid-tempo ballad has Ali-Ollie Woodson  praising his "lady" for warming his "heart" and making him "whole".

Described as "super" by AllMusic critic Ron Wynn, "Lady Soul" was one of the last Temptations single to make the Top Ten on the US R&B Chart. The single peaked at #4 on the Soul Charts and #47 on the US Hot 100. It proved that Motown, even into the late 1980s, was still releasing "interesting" and "entertaining" material by its veteran artists.

References

1986 songs
1986 singles
The Temptations songs
Songs written by Mark Holden
Gordy Records singles